The Forbidden Fountain of Oz is a 1980 children's novel written by Eloise Jarvis McGraw and her daughter Lauren Lynn Mcgraw (or McGraw Wagner), and illustrated by Dick Martin. As its title indicates, the book is one entry in the long-running series of Oz books written by L. Frank Baum and his many successors.

The authors
The McGraws, mother and daughter, wrote an earlier Oz book, Merry Go Round in Oz, published in 1963. In their collaboration, the elder McGraw, a veteran children's book author, did the actual writing; she credited her daughter Lauren with story contributions. In Forbidden Fountain, the text is prefaced with an address to "Dear Fans of Oz, Young, Old, and In-Between," which calls Lauren Lynn McGraw "Assistant Inventor and Head Trouble-Shooter," while Eloise Jarvis McGraw signs herself as "Chief of Bureau of Extraordinary Communications."

The plot
A child named Emeralda Ozgood, a native of the Emerald City, prepares a concoction of limeade to celebrate the annual Clover Fair — but she naively uses water from the Forbidden Fountain. She only has one customer before she drops and breaks her pitcher; but that customer is Princess Ozma, who drinks the drink and loses her memory. Wandering off and losing her crown, Ozma falls in with a series of new acquaintances, including the Monarch of the Butterflies (who names her "Poppy" after the flowers in her hair) and a talking hedgebird who advises her.

Outfitted in boy's clothes and hat, Ozma/Poppy meets a lamb named Lambert, who is ostracized from his Gillikin flock for his unnatural white color. The two stumble into Camouflage Creek, and undergo a bewildering string of transformations into bugs and beasts. Back in their own forms, they are confronted by an inept would-be highwayman named Tobias Bridlecull Jr., who quickly becomes the third member of their rambling trio. He carries a Suggestion Box that volunteers suggestions instead of receiving them — as in "Suggest lunch" and "Suggest oil for Suggestion Box."

Returning home to Pumperdink from the Clover Fair, Kabumpo the Elegant Elephant falls into adventures of his own; he is waylaid by the animated toys of Wyndup Town. The elephant literally dumps into "Poppy" and company among the bubblegum and mucilage geysers (or "gozzers") of Gozzerland National Park. The four travelers combine, for further adventures in Cleanitupia and Pristinia. It is only when Kabumpo sees "Poppy" with her long hair unconfined that he recognizes Ozma; then he needs to win the trust of the suspicious amnesiac and bring her home to the Emerald City. (He fails completely at the winning of trust, and hauls her back bodily.) Eventually, Ozma uses the Magic Belt to restore her memory and return to normal.

The Forbidden Fountain is sealed off forever, as a threat.

Details
The McGraws, like other Oz authors, have to make choices among the vast and sometimes contradictory details of life in Oz. They choose to give Oz a currency (of "ozzos" and "piozters"); but in the third chapter of The Emerald City of Oz, Baum specifically states that there is "no such thing as money..." in Oz. (As the Tin Woodman says in the fifteenth chapter of The Road to Oz, "Money in Oz!...What a queer idea!") Baum, however, was not wholly consistent in this detail (as in others),  and the early books in the series do feature Oz currency.

Animals talk in the book; even insects do. Yet animals also eat each other: while transformed into talking dragonflies, "Poppy" and Lambert eat their fill of "what-gnats."  Later, a Purple Wolf wants to eat Lambert. This raises the vexing question of death in Oz.

Some of the book's action is set in a border region between the Gillikin Country and the Winkie Country, which allows a blending of the two regions' characteristic colors, purple and yellow. Lauren McGraw provided the book with a map that situates the Winkie Country in the western quadrant of Oz, as in Baum's original scheme.

Forbidden fountain
The forbidden fountain of the title is the same created by Baum in his sixth Oz book, The Emerald City of Oz — an enchanted fountain that purges the memories of all who drink its Water of Oblivion. In that book, the fountain provides the resolution of the plot conflict, through which the invading hordes of a barbarian army are defeated without violence. The fountain appears in later Oz books by Baum and his followers; it is significant in Baum's The Magic of Oz, Rachel Cosgrove Payes's The Wicked Witch of Oz, and Edward Einhorn's Paradox in Oz.

A rich imaginative heritage lies behind Baum's fountain. There is a "forbidden fountain" in Welsh mythology, though instead of effecting drinkers' memories it expels them from fairyland, where it is located. The idea of forbidden drink is closely related to that of forbidden food, which occurs most famously in the "forbidden fruit" of the Tree of Knowledge of Good and Evil in the Book of Genesis, but in other contexts too.

The idea of water that purges the drinker's memory is also ancient. In Greek mythology it occurs as the river Lethe: the souls of the dead lose their memories of their earthly lives by drinking its water. The same idea can also be found in Eastern and other literatures, as in the "Well of the Waters of Forgetfulness" and other guises. "The 'Drink of Forgetfulness' is found in Greek, Hindu, Norse, and other mythologies." The concept received an eighteenth-century expression in James Ridley's The Tales of the Genii (1764), and from there made its way into drama and even to the visual arts, in John Martin's Sadak in Search of the Waters of Oblivion (1812).

Baum, however, made a noteworthy innovation in giving his Water of Oblivion a moral dimension. In his fantasy universe, those who drink from the Forbidden Fountain not only lose their recollections but become benign, "as innocent as babes." (Though this is irrelevant to Princess Ozma, who was benign to begin with.)

References

External links
 On The Forbidden Fountain of Oz

Oz (franchise) books
1980 fantasy novels
1980 American novels
1980 children's books